John Brent (14 March 1938, in Madison, Connecticut – 16 August 1985, in Los Angeles) was an American comedian, actor and beat poet.

He was part of the Second City comedy club, and then later The Committee. He is mainly known for being half the duo behind the 1959 How To Speak Hip comedy album with Del Close. Otherwise he recorded and published little, since he died at a relatively young age. He also appeared as an actor in such films as Bob & Carol & Ted & Alice, Catch-22, Steelyard Blues, and American Graffiti.

Brent is survived by his son, Jeremy Paz, who resides in San Francisco.

Filmography

Film

Television

References

1938 births
1985 deaths
American male comedians
American male film actors
People from Madison, Connecticut
20th-century American male actors
20th-century American poets
20th-century American comedians